Pipunculus campestris  is a species of fly in the family Pipunculidae. It is found in the Palearctic.

Distribution
Europe.

References

External links
Images representing  Pipunculus at BOLD

Pipunculidae
Insects described in 1805
Diptera of Europe
Taxa named by Pierre André Latreille